Boharina is a settlement in the Municipality of Zreče in northeastern Slovenia. It lies in the foothills of the Pohorje Hills, above the left bank of the upper Dravinja River, just north of Zreče. The area is part of the traditional region of Styria. It is now included with the rest of the municipality in the Savinja Statistical Region.

References

External links

Boharina at Geopedia

Populated places in the Municipality of Zreče